An expletive attributive is an adjective or adverb (or adjectival or adverbial phrase) that does not contribute to the meaning of a sentence, but is used to intensify its emotional force. Often such words or phrases are regarded as profanity or "bad language", though there are also inoffensive expletive attributives. The word is derived from the Latin verb , meaning "to fill", and it was originally introduced into English in the 17th century for various kinds of padding.

Etymology 
Expletive comes from the Latin verb , meaning "to fill", via , "filling out". It was introduced into English in the 17th century for various kinds of padding—the padding out of a book with peripheral material, the addition of syllables to a line of poetry for metrical purposes, and so forth. The use of expletive for such a meaning is now rare. Rather, expletive is a linguistics term for a meaningless word filling a syntactic vacancy. Outside linguistics, the word is commonly used to refer to "bad language" or profanity. Some linguists use it as shorthand for "expletive attributive".

Usage 

There are many attributive adjectives and adverbs in English that function to indicate a speaker's anger, irritation or (in some cases) strong approval without otherwise modifying the meaning of the phrase in which they occur. An example is the word bloody as used in the following sentences:

 "You'd better pray for a  miracle if you want to avoid bankruptcy."
 "That was a  good meal."
 "You'd better  make it happen!"

An expletive attributive is a type of intensifier. Unlike other adjective or adverb usage, bloody or bloody well in these sentences do not modify the meaning of miracle, good meal, or make it happen. The expletive attributives here suggest that the speaker feels strongly about the proposition being expressed. Other vulgar words may also be used in this way:

 "The  policeman tailed me all the  way home."
 "I  hope he  chokes on his  peanuts."

Words that are never thought of as offensive can be used in similar ways. For example:

 "I forgot to pay the phone bill twice running, so the  line was cut off."

The phone line discussed may have, before it was cut off, been just as good as any other, so would not have been wretched in the literal senses of "extremely shoddy", "devoid of hope" or similar. Rather, wretched serves here as a politer equivalent of expletive bloody and the like.

Infixation and interposition 

Besides usual positioning for adverbs and attributive adjectives, expletive attributives can be found in unusual positions where others rarely are (including other intensifiers). Although considered colloquial at best, they are inserted:

 inside morphemes
 between bases and affixes
 inside compounds
 inside letter and numeral words
 inside names
 between an adverb, negative or intensifier and an adjective
 between an adjectival or determiner and a noun
 between a preposition and a noun
 between a verb and a particle or adverb
 between an auxiliary and a verb
 preceding the post-modifier else
 inside idioms
 between a wh- form and a predicate

Depending on the precise definition (and the grammarian's general approach), these insertions may be classed as infixation, tmesis, diacope, interposition or unrecognized.

See also 
 Affect (linguistics)

Notes and references

Notes

References 

Lexical semantics
Profanity